Duliby may refer to the following places in Ukraine:

 Duliby, Stryi Raion, a village in Stryi Raion, Lviv Oblast
 Duliby, Buchach Raion, a village in Buchach Raion, Ternopil Oblast